Angela Luce (born 3 December 1937) is an Italian film actress and singer of Neapolitan song. She has appeared in 80 films since 1958. She was born in Naples, Italy.

Partial filmography

 La sposa (1958) - Margherita
 Avventura a Capri (1959) - Francesca
 Il vedovo (1959) - Margherita
 Le sorprese dell'amore (1959) - Gaspare Florio's Girlfriend
 Ferdinando I, re di Napoli (1959) - Cook in the royal Palace (uncredited)
 Gastone (1960) - Ivonne
 Gentlemen Are Born (1960) - Prassede
 A noi piace freddo (1960) - Franca
 Letto a tre piazze (1960) - Jeannette
 Toto, Fabrizi and the Young People Today (1960)
 La contessa azzurra (1960) - Donna Zenobia
 Anonima cocottes (1960)
 Caravan petrol (1960)
 Some Like It Cold (1961)
 Pastasciutta nel deserto (1961) - Jolanda
 Che femmina!! E... che dollari! (1961)
 Roaring Years (Anni ruggenti, 1962) - Rosa De Bellis
 Odio mortale (1962) - Conchita
 March on Rome (La Marcia su Roma, 1962) - La contadina
 Divorzio alla siciliana (1963)
 Adultero lui, adultera lei (1963) - La cameriera napoletana
 I ragazzi dell'hully-gully (1964)
 Due mafiosi contro Al Capone (1966) - Santuzza
 For a Few Dollars Less (Per qualche dollaro in meno, 1966) - La donna del Ranch
 Un gangster venuto da Brooklyn (1966) - Marina
 Shoot Loud, Louder... I Don't Understand (Spara forte, più forte... non-capisco!, 1966) - Beautiful Woman
 The Stranger (Lo straniero, 1967) - Madame Masson
 Where Are You Going All Naked? (Dove vai tutta nuda?, 1969) - Prostitute
 Specialists (Gli specialisti, 1969) - Valencia
 Pensiero d'amore (1969) - Countess Stefania Varaldi
 Ma chi t'ha dato la patente? (1970)
 Il debito coniugale (1970)
 Ninì Tirabusciò: la donna che inventò la mossa (1970) - Nando's Woman
 Cose di Cosa Nostra (1971)
 The Decameron (Il decameron, 1971) - Peronella
 Man of the Year (Homo Eroticus, 1971) - Maid
 'Tis Pity She's a Whore (Addio, fratello crudele, 1971) - Mercante's Governess
 Malicious (Malizia, 1973) - Ines Corallo
 Il gioco della verità (1974)
 Io tigro, tu tigri, egli tigra (1978) - Annalise
 L'immoralità (1978) - (uncredited)
 Lo scugnizzo (1979)
 Il Contratto (1981)
 Lacrime napulitane (1981) - Angela Lenci
 Zampognaro innamorato (1983) - Angela Leuci
 Pacco, doppio pacco e contropaccotto (1993) - La madre del professore
 La Chance (1994) - Donna Angela
 Nasty Love (L'amore molesto, 1995) - Amalia / Mother
 La vita, per un'altra volta (1999) - Madre di Marcello
 Terra bruciata (1999) - Assunta - wife of Macrì
 The Three-Legged Fox (2004) - Lucia
 The Second Wedding Night (La seconda notte di nozze, 2005) - Suntina Ricci
 Passione (2010) - (archive footage)

Selected discography
 I Colori Della Vita (2004, Polosud Records)

References

External links

  Angela Luce filmography at Movieplayer.it

Italian film actresses
1938 births
Living people
Musicians from Naples
David di Donatello winners
Italian women singers
20th-century Italian actresses